Gregory Scarpa (May 8, 1928 – June 4, 1994) nicknamed the Grim Reaper and also the Mad Hatter, was an American caporegime and hitman for the Colombo crime family, as well as an informant for the FBI. During the 1970s and 80s, Scarpa was the chief enforcer and veteran hitman for Colombo boss Carmine Persico. He is suspected by the FBI to have murdered at least 100 people over the course of his criminal career. He was sentenced to life in prison in 1993 for three murders, and died on June 4, 1994.

Biography
Scarpa was born to first-generation immigrants, Salvatore and Mary, from the small village of Lorenzaga of Motta di Livenza near Treviso, Italy. He was raised in the working-class neighborhood of Bensonhurst in Brooklyn. As a child living in the Great Depression, Scarpa helped his father deliver coal throughout New York City. His older brother, Salvatore Scarpa, may have introduced Gregory to the Colombo crime family which he reportedly joined in the 1950s.

In the 1950s, Scarpa married Connie Forrest; she and Scarpa had one daughter and three sons, including Gregory Scarpa Jr., who would follow his father into the Colombo family, eventually becoming a capo. Scarpa and Forrest separated in 1973.  Scarpa also maintained a 30-year relationship with girlfriend Linda Schiro that resulted in two children, Joseph and Linda.

Scarpa was a stylish dresser who routinely carried $5,000 in pocket money for purchases and bribes. He had use of an apartment on Manhattan's Sutton Place and owned homes in Brooklyn and Staten Island, as well as Las Vegas, Nevada, and Singer Island, Florida. His power, guile and brutality earned him the nickname "the Grim Reaper" and helped him escape prosecution for many years. Schiro later said that Scarpa would sometimes leave the numbers "666", the biblical Number of the Beast, on his victims' pagers.

A career criminal, Scarpa eventually became a caporegime in the Colombo family, as well as the proprietor of the Wimpy Boys Social Club. Scarpa was involved in illegal gambling, loansharking, extortion, hijacking, counterfeit credit cards, assault, stock and bond thefts, narcotics and murder. Many of the highest-ranking members of the Colombo family today were members of Scarpa's crew. In March 1962, Scarpa was arrested for armed robbery. To avoid prosecution, Scarpa agreed to work as an undercover informant for the FBI, beginning a 30-year relationship with the agency.

Recovery of the bodies of Chaney, Goodman, and Schwerner

In the summer of 1964, according to Schiro and other sources, FBI field agents in Mississippi recruited Scarpa to help them find missing civil rights workers Andrew Goodman, James Chaney, and Michael Schwerner. The FBI was convinced the three men had been murdered, but could not find their bodies. The agents thought that Scarpa, using illegal interrogation techniques not available to agents, might succeed at gaining this information from suspects.

Once Scarpa arrived in Mississippi, local agents allegedly provided him with a gun and money to pay for information. Scarpa and an agent allegedly pistol-whipped and kidnapped Lawrence Byrd, a TV salesman and secret Klansman, from his store in Laurel and took him to Camp Shelby, a local Army base. At Shelby, Scarpa severely beat Byrd and stuck a gun barrel down his throat.  Byrd finally revealed to Scarpa the location of the three men's bodies. The FBI has never officially confirmed the Scarpa story. Though not necessarily contradicting the claim of Scarpa's involvement in the matter, investigative journalist Jerry Mitchell and Illinois high school teacher Barry Bradford claimed that Mississippi highway patrolman Maynard King provided the grave locations to FBI agent Joseph Sullivan after obtaining the information from an anonymous third party.

In January 1966, Scarpa allegedly helped the FBI a second time in Mississippi on the murder case of Vernon Dahmer, killed in a fire set by the Klan. After this second trip, Scarpa and the FBI had a sharp disagreement about his reward for these services. The FBI then dropped Scarpa as a confidential informant.

FBI informant
In 1980, FBI agent Lindley DeVecchio became Scarpa's contact and handler and restarted his relationship with the FBI. Scarpa had refused contact with the FBI for the previous five years, but DeVecchio persuaded him to cooperate again. Gregory Jr., Schiro, and federal prosecutors later claimed that Scarpa had numerous illegal dealings with DeVecchio. Scarpa allegedly provided DeVecchio with cash, jewelry and other gifts along with information of questionable value on the Colombos. In return, DeVecchio allegedly protected Scarpa from arrest and provided him with information about his rivals during the Third Colombo War.

Over the years, the FBI reportedly paid Scarpa $158,000 for his services. According to mob associates, he would joke about "Girlfriend", a female friend in law enforcement who gave him information. For ten years, DeVecchio met alone with Scarpa, often at an apartment or hotel room provided by the FBI. DeVecchio was a frequent dinner guest at Scarpa's house and on one occasion received a hard-to-find Cabbage Patch doll from Scarpa as a gift. Some of DeVecchio's fellow agents were disturbed by his closeness to Scarpa, and were soon reporting it to their FBI superiors.

In 1985, federal prosecutors indicted Scarpa for running a major credit card scam. After he pleaded guilty, prosecutors asked the court to give him a sizable fine and a prison sentence. However, DeVecchio submitted a memo to the judge that listed all of Scarpa's contributions to the FBI. The judge finally sentenced Scarpa to five years probation with no prison time and a $10,000 fine. Colombo members were so surprised by Scarpa's light sentence that some started wondering if he was working for the government.

HIV infection
After having emergency ulcer surgery at Victory Memorial Hospital in Brooklyn in 1986, Scarpa received several blood donations from family members and associates. Scarpa had refused blood from the hospital blood bank. Scarpa eventually got blood from mobster Paul Mele, a bodybuilder who was using injectable anabolic steroids. Mele had contracted HIV from a dirty needle and transmitted it to Scarpa in the blood transfusion.

Surgeons at Mount Sinai Hospital in Manhattan eventually removed Scarpa's stomach. On August 30, 1992, he received a $300,000 settlement in civil court from his first surgeon and Victory Hospital for negligence. As Scarpa's illness progressed to AIDS, he and his relatives told everyone that he was suffering from cancer.

Assassination attempt and retaliation
In 1991, supporters of Colombo rebel and acting boss Victor Orena attempted to kill Scarpa. Earlier in 1991, a struggle between Orena and imprisoned Colombo boss Carmine Persico resulted in violence. Persico's loyalists had unsuccessfully attempted to kill Orena at his Brooklyn home. In retaliation, Orena decided to murder Scarpa, one of Persico's strongest supporters. On November 18, 1991, Scarpa was driving his own car in Brooklyn, followed behind by his 22-year-old daughter Linda and 8-month-old grandson, when he was stopped by two cars. Hitmen ran from their vehicles with guns drawn and converged on Scarpa's car, but Scarpa managed to drive away from the ambush, crashing into anything that got in his way. A few bystanders were injured, but Scarpa and his relatives escaped unharmed.

During the seven-month conflict between Persico and Orena, Scarpa served as Persico's military commander. Although weakened by illness, he constantly cruised along Avenue U in Brooklyn, looking for Orena supporters in social clubs and bars. Incensed by the murder attempt on his family, Scarpa was especially watchful for Orena loyalist William Cutolo, who had organized it. Over the next few weeks, Scarpa and his associates (mistakenly) killed Genovese family mobster Thomas Amato and Orena loyalists Rosario Nastasa, Vincent Fusaro, and James Malpiso. Scarpa allegedly shot Fusaro as he was hanging Christmas lights on his house.

Prison and death
In 1992, Scarpa's AIDS lawsuit was settled with $300,000 in cash payments to his family. In 1992, while appearing at a New York civil courtroom for his medical lawsuit, Scarpa was arrested for violating state firearms laws. Soon after, he was indicted on federal racketeering charges involving three murders.

On December 29, 1992, while under house arrest with an electronic monitoring device, Scarpa lost an eye in a shootout with other mobsters. Two Lucchese family mobsters, Michael DeRosa and Ronald Moran, had threatened Joey Scarpa, Gregory's son, over a drug deal. Climbing out of bed, the elder Scarpa drove with Joey to DeRosa's house and shot DeRosa. Moran fired back and hit Scarpa in the eye. Back at his house, Scarpa allegedly poured some Scotch Whisky into his wound, assured the authorities everything was fine, and later went to the hospital. Prosecutors revoked Scarpa's house arrest and sent him to jail.

By 1993, Scarpa was blind in one eye, emaciated and in poor health. On May 6, 1993, he pleaded guilty to three murders and conspiracy to murder several others. On December 15, 1993, Scarpa was sentenced to life in federal prison. This sentence was later reduced to 10 years due to Scarpa's poor health. On June 4, 1994, Gregory Scarpa Sr. died in the Federal Medical Center (FMC) for prisoners in Rochester, Minnesota, from AIDS-related complications.

Aftermath
Scarpa's status as an informer was only revealed in 1995, during a racketeering and murder trial of seven members of the Orena faction.  At that time, former Colombo family consigliere Carmine Sessa, now a government witness, told prosecutors about DeVecchio's corrupt dealings with Scarpa. Eventually, prosecutors were forced to reveal that DeVecchio might have revealed confidential information, including information about former Colombo members who had turned informer, to Scarpa. Ultimately, 19 Orena supporters had murder charges thrown out or murder convictions reversed after their attorneys contended DeVecchio's collaboration with Scarpa tainted the evidence against them. The attorneys argued that DeVecchio gave Scarpa information he used to kill members of the Orena faction, thus making any killings committed by their clients acts of self-defense.

On March 30, 2006, DeVecchio, who was forced to retire from the FBI in 1996, was indicted on charges of complicity with Scarpa and other Colombo mobsters in four murders during the 1980s and 1990s. The government case rested on the testimony of Linda Schiro, who was soon discredited as a witness after Tom Robbins of The Village Voice revealed that she had granted an interview to Robbins and Jerry Capeci a decade earlier and denied the agent had ever been involved. Robbins said that while he and Capeci had promised to protect Schiro's identity and not attribute any of her revelations to her, the prospect of DeVecchio facing life in prison trumped any promises they had made to Schiro. On November 1, 2007, the judge dismissed all charges against DeVecchio at the request of prosecutors.

Scarpa's other son, Greg Scarpa Jr., was sentenced to 40 years in prison for racketeering, conspiracy to commit murder and other charges.

In media

Books
The April 2009 book Mafia Son: The Scarpa Mob Family, the FBI, and a Story of Betrayal by Sandra Harmon, covers the author's access to the mob, law enforcement, and jailed Gregory Scarpa Jr. revealing the crimes and acts of betrayal. St. Martin's Press, 288 pages.

The July 2013 book Deal with the Devil: The FBI's Secret Thirty-Year Relationship with a Mafia Killer by Peter Lance, reports on 30 years of FBI files revealing Scarpa's secret betrayal to the Colombo crime family while being an FBI informant. William Morrow and Company, 672 pages.

The December 2015 book The Mafia Hit Man's Daughter by Linda Scarpa; Linda Rosencrance, reflects Scarpa's history from his daughter Linda Scarpa's perspective.  Pinnacle Books, 288 pages.

Television and film
The CBS series 60 Minutes aired the episode "Armstrong/The FBI and the Grim Reaper", with a majority of the episode, "Armstrong", reporting on cyclist Lance Armstrong and the use of performance-enhancing drugs. A brief portion of the episode,  "The FBI and the Grim Reaper", examines FBI agent Lin DeVecchio's ties to informant Gregory Scarpa. Season 43, episode 34; run time (segment): 8 minutes; first aired: May 2011.

The Investigation Discovery channel released in the series I Married a Mobster, episode "The Grim Reaper", reporting on Linda Schiro's, a Brooklyn teenager, love triangle involving Scarpa and another man (both men were married).  Scarpa wins Linda's devotion and shows her struggles with losing a child, impacts from his Mafia ties and being left alone upon his downfall. Season 1, episode 3; run time: 21 minutes; first aired: July 2011.

The Biography Channel series Mobsters, episode "The Grim Reaper: Greg Scarpa" depicts Scarpa's Mafia ties, father and husband lifestyles and his FBI informant profile. Season 4, episode 7; run time: 42 minutes; first aired: August 2012.

Investigation Discovery released a second documentary of Scarpa's crimes in the episode "The Grim Reaper" from the series Evil Lives Here. Season 4, episode 7;  run time: 42 minutes; first aired: September 2018.

In the 1988 film Mississippi Burning, the character of Agent Monk (played by Badja Djola) and his abduction of a Klansman were based on Scarpa and his alleged abduction and intimidation of a Klansman. The abductor of the Klan-connected Mayor Tilman was originally written as a Mafia hitman who forces a confession by putting a pistol in Tillman's mouth. Screenwriter Chris Gerolmo was inspired to create this character after reading about Scarpa's alleged recruitment by the FBI during their search for Goodman, Chaney and Schwerner.

See also
Mississippi Burning

References

External links
FBI Records: The Vault Files, Gregory Scarpa, Sr.

 

1928 births
1994 deaths
People from Motta di Livenza
Colombo crime family
American gangsters of Italian descent
Federal Bureau of Investigation informants
People from Bensonhurst, Brooklyn
American people who died in prison custody
Prisoners who died in United States federal government detention
AIDS-related deaths in Minnesota
Mafia hitmen
American people convicted of murder